or  is a municipality in Nordland county, Norway. It is part of the traditional region of Vesterålen. The administrative centre of the municipality is the town of Sortland. Other population centres in Sortland include Bø, Holand, Holmstad, Liland, Sigerfjord, Strand, and Vik. The Norwegian Coast Guard has its northern base in Sortland, called Kystvaktskvadron Nord.

In 1997, the municipal council declared "town status" for the urban area of Sortland. Sortland is the largest town and commercial centre in Vesterålen. The town of Sortland is located close to the Sortland Bridge which crosses the Sortlandsundet strait and connects the two large islands of Langøya and Hinnøya by road. Since a lot of houses in the town are painted blue, Sortland is sometimes referred to as "the blue city".

The  municipality is the 159th largest by area out of the 356 municipalities in Norway. Sortland is the 109th most populous municipality in Norway with a population of 10,468. In January 2012, the number of citizens in Sortland reached 10,000 for the first time.

General information

The municipality of Sortland was established in 1841 when it was separated from the large Hadsel Municipality. 

During the 1960s, there were many municipal mergers across Norway due to the work of the Schei Committee. On 1 January 1963, the Holm area (population: 65) along the Gavlfjorden was transferred from Langenes Municipality to Sortland. Also on that date, the area around the inner and western part of the Eidsfjorden (population: 1,360) was transferred from Hadsel Municipality to Sortland.  

On 1 January 2000, the area surrounding the Godfjorden was transferred from Kvæfjord Municipality (and Troms county) to Sortland (and Nordland county).

Name
The municipality (originally the parish) is named after the old Sortland farm since the first Sortland Church was built there.

Coat of arms
The coat of arms was granted on 15 March 1985. The official blazon is "Azure, a castle with three towers without crenelation Or". This means the arms have a blue field (background) and the charge is a castle with a gate and three towers without crenelation. The castle has a tincture of Or which means it is commonly colored yellow, but if it is made out of metal, then gold is used. The blue color in the field symbolizes the importance of sea and the castle is an updated version of an old coat of arms for Sortland. The castle gate symbolizes Sortland as the gateway to the Vesterålen region and that it is the commercial centre of the region as well. The arms were designed by Kurt Myrland.

The old coat of arms was in use from the 1950s until 1985 when the new arms were granted. The arms showed a castle (very similar to the one in the current arms) in a stylized landscape, including waves and sun rays. The arms included a golden border with three black-white-black piles issuing from both flanks of the white castle. Also, there were four red sun rays issuing from behind the castle (four piles issuant from chief and flanks conjoined in heart), and in the base there were waves of red, black, and white. In the white chief inscribed the word "Sortland". A mural crown with four embattlements was on the top.

Churches
The Church of Norway has one parish within the municipality of Sortland. It is part of the Vesterålen prosti (deanery) in the Diocese of Sør-Hålogaland.

Geography
The municipality of Sortland is located on the islands of Langøya and Hinnøya in the Vesterålen archipelago. The municipality surrounds the inner part of the Eidsfjorden and the Sortlandssundet strait. There are several bridges in the municipality including Djupfjordstraumen Bridge, Kvalsaukan Bridge, and Sortland Bridge. The Sortland Bridge is located just north of the town of Sortland. One of the main roads through the municipality is Norwegian County Road 82. The mountain Møysalen and part of Møysalen National Park are located in southern Sortland.

Midnight Sun and Aurora Borealis
The midnight sun occurs from May 23 to July 23. Great places to observe the midnight sun includes the Sortland Bridge, Ramnflauget, Godfjorden, Holm, and Skytterhaugen in the Vestmarka residential area. Because of Sortland's high latitude, there is no real darkness between late April and mid-August.

Polar night occurs in Sortland from 30 November to 12 January when the sun remains below the horizon and is not visible at all. The return of the sun is an occasion for celebration in Northern Norway, known as "Soldagen" (lit. Day of the sun) which is commonly celebrated with children getting the day off from school. The polar night does not mean that it becomes totally dark, typically daylight is visible for a few hours around noon.

Sortland and the Vesterålen region are perfect for observing the spectacular Aurora Borealis (Northern Lights) phenomenon. The aurora borealis trails its multi coloured banner across the sky and the moon lights the scene making it a breathtaking experience. Pictures taken here have been presented in National Geographic Magazine.

Climate
Sortland has a subpolar oceanic climate. The weather station (Sortland-Kleiva) has been recording since January 1956. The record low   was set in January 2016 (extremes available since 2004). The average date for the last overnight freeze (low below ) in spring is 7 May and average date for first freeze in autumn is 14 October giving a frost-free season of 159 days (1981-2010 average).

Government
All municipalities in Norway, including Sortland, are responsible for primary education (through 10th grade), outpatient health services, senior citizen services, unemployment and other social services, zoning, economic development, and municipal roads. The municipality is governed by a municipal council of elected representatives, which in turn elect a mayor.  The municipality falls under the Vesterålen District Court and the Hålogaland Court of Appeal.

Municipal council
The municipal council of Sortland is made up of 27 representatives that are elected to four year terms. The party breakdown of the council is as follows:

Mayor
The mayors of Sortland (incomplete list):

1841: Abel Ellingsen 
1842-1843: Jørgen Ottesen 	
1844-1852: Abel Ellingsen 	
1853-1856: C.H. Schanche 	
1857-1868: Abel Ellingsen 	
1869-1870: Laurits Ottesen 
1871-1874: Anton Holst 
1875-1876: Kristoffer Johnsen 
1877-1880: Laurits Ottesen 
1881-1882: E. Dietrichen 
1883-1884: Laurits Ottesen	
1885-1892: H. Knudsen 
1893-1894: H.M. Stoltz	
1895-1896: Jens N.A. Ellingsen 
1897-1901: H. Knudsen 
1902-1904: H.M. Stoltz 
1905-1907: H. Knudsen 
1908-1910: H.M. Stoltz 
1911-1913: Georg Ellingsen 
1914-1916: Olaf Holm 
1917-1919: J.D. Hammer 
1920-1922: Bernhard J. Steiro 
1923-1925: Dag Ellingsen 
1926: Per Lunde 
1927-1928: Andreas Thomassen 
1929-1931: Anton J. Myhre 
1932-1934: Ottar Lunde 
1935-1936: Halvdan Bygdnes 
1937-1940: P.C. Reinsnes (Ap)
1946-1959: P.C. Reinsnes (Ap)
1960-1962: Ottar Wik 
1963-1975: P.C. Reinsnes (Ap)
1976-1979: Thormod Olsen (H)
1980-1981: Terje Johanssen 
1982-1987: Anton Pettersen 
1988-1994: Hill-Marta Solberg (Ap)
1994-1995: Ronald Steen 
1995-2003: Ingolf Markussen (H)
2003-2011: Svein Roar Jacobsen (Ap)
2011-2015: Grete Ellingsen (H)
2015-2019: Tove Mette Bjørkmo (Ap)
2019–present: Karl-Erling Nordlund (Sp)

Music and culture

Sortland has been regarded as one of the best music communities in Norway, and the local band Madrugada has been one of the best ones in the nation. Sortland Jazz Festival is an event organized by Sortland Jazz and Music Club, which takes place every autumn. Some of the world's leading jazz musicians have been participating.

Shopping
Sortland is the largest commercial centre in Vesterålen with several indoors shopping centers and many small businesses. The retail turnover per inhabitant in Sortland is greater than in any other town in North Norway. Sortland is one of the few North Norwegian towns that have grown annually since the 1970s.

Notable residents

 Knut Hamsun (1859–1952) the Nobel Prize–winning author wrote his novel Den Sidste Glæde (The Last Joy) in Sortland Hotel in 1911/12
 Petter Carl Reinsnes (1904 in Reinsnes – 1976) politician, long-time Mayor of Sortland
 Hill-Marta Solberg (born 1951 in Sortland) politician and County Governor of Nordland  
 Lars Saabye Christensen (born 1953) a Norwegian/Danish author, lived in Sortland
 Olav Christopher Jenssen (born 1954 in Sortland) a Norwegian artist and academic
 Oddmund Finnseth (born 1957 in Sortland) a jazz musician, composer and music teacher
 Sivert Høyem  (born 1976 in Kleiva) singer with the rock band Madrugada
 Krister Wemberg (born 1992 in Sortland) a footballer with over 200 club caps
 Ingrid Skjoldvær (born 1993) a Norwegian environmentalist with Nature and Youth

Gallery

References

External links

Municipal fact sheet from Statistics Norway 
Information from Sortland Municipality  
Vesterålen Tourist information
Forfjorddalen nature reserve (the oldest pine trees in Norway) 

 
Vesterålen
Municipalities of Nordland
Populated places of Arctic Norway
1841 establishments in Norway